Bolesław Tejkowski (15 December 1933 – 4 June 2022) was a Polish sociologist, engineer, academic, and politician.

Tejkowski died on 4 June 2022 at the age of 88.

References

1933 births
2022 deaths
Polish sociologists
Polish engineers
Polish academics
Polish politicians
Tadeusz Kościuszko University of Technology alumni
Academic staff of Tadeusz Kościuszko University of Technology
People from Inowrocław County